The 2019 Nigerian House of Representatives elections in Lagos State was held on February 23, 2019, to elect members of the House of Representatives to represent Lagos State, Nigeria. The election for Ojo federal constituency was declared inconclusive due to collation of results allegedly being interrupted by accusation and counter-accusation by  agents of the political parties. On the 10th of March 2019, INEC declared PDP's Tajudeen Obasa, winner of the election.

Overview

Summary

Results

Agege 
A total of 10 candidates registered with the Independent National Electoral Commission to contest in the election. APC candidate Samuel Adejare won the election, defeating PDP Joseph Oluwole and 8 other party candidates. Adejare received 60.76% of the votes, while Oluwole received 26.27%.

Ajeromi/Ifelodun 
A total of 12 candidates registered with the Independent National Electoral Commission to contest in the election. APC candidate Kolawole Taiwo won the election, defeating PDP Rita Orji and 10 other candidates. Rita Orji won by popular votes in the February elections but an election tribunal ruled in favour of Kolawole Taiwo after a re-run. Taiwo received 43.42% of the votes in the February election, while Orji received 54.12%.

Alimosho 
A total of 16 candidates registered with the Independent National Electoral Commission to contest in the election. APC candidate Olufemi Adebanjo won the election, defeating PDP Akinwale Akinsanya and 14 other party candidates. Adebanjo received 54.91% of the votes, while Akinsanya received 37.39%.

Amuwo Odofin 
A total of 14 candidates registered with the Independent National Electoral Commission to contest in the election. PDP candidate Oghene Egoh won the election, defeating APC Risikat Adegeye and 12 other candidates. Egoh received 57.25% of the votes, while Adegeye received 33.61%.

Apapa 
A total of 12 candidates registered with the Independent National Electoral Commission to contest in the election. APC candidate Mufutau Egberongbe won the election, defeating PDP Adewole Oludare and 10 other candidates. Egberongbe received 58.94% of the votes, while Oludare received 38.87%.

Badagry 
A total of 12 candidates registered with the Independent National Electoral Commission to contest in the election. APC candidate Babatunde Hunpe won the election, defeating PDP Seyon Hunyinbo and 10 other party candidates. Hunpe received 58.60% of the votes, while Huyinbo received 39.38%.

Epe 
A total of 10 candidates registered with the Independent National Electoral Commission to contest in the election. APC candidate Tasir Raji won the election, defeating PDP Oyebolaji Ayodeji and 8 other party candidates. Raji received 57.48% of the votes, while Ayodeji  received 41.77%.

Eti-Osa 
A total of 41 candidates registered with the Independent National Electoral Commission to contest in the election. APC candidate Ibrahim Obanikoro won the election, defeating PDP Anthony Akala and 39 other party candidates. Obanikoro received 43.14% of the votes, while Akala received 36.38%.

Ibeju-Lekki 
A total of 9 candidates registered with the Independent National Electoral Commission to contest in the election. APC candidate Adebayo Balogun won the election, defeating Accord Olowu Abiola and 7 other party candidates. Balogun received 43.19% of the votes, while Abiola received 31.29%.

Ifako/Ijaiye 
A total of 15 candidates registered with the Independent National Electoral Commission to contest in the election. APC candidate James Owolabi won the election, defeating PDP Fatimoh Mohammed and 13 other party candidates. Owolabi received 63.85% of the votes, while Mohammed received 34.11%.

Ikeja 
A total of 19 candidates registered with the Independent National Electoral Commission to contest in the election. APC candidate Abiodun Faleke won the election, defeating PDP Mutiu Olakunle and 17 other party candidates. Faleke received 51.92% of the votes, while Olakunle received 44.05%.

Ikorodu 
A total of 11 candidates registered with the Independent National Electoral Commission to contest in the election. APC candidate Babajimi Benson won the election, defeating PDP Ramota Disu and 9 other party candidates. Benson received 67.23% of the votes, while Disu received 31.32%.

Kosofe 
A total of 9 candidates registered with the Independent National Electoral Commission to contest in the election. APC candidate Oluwarotimi Agunsoye won the election, defeating PDP Sherifat Olushola-Hassan and 7 other party candidates. Agunsoye received 58.63% of the votes, while Olushola-Hassan received 39.59%.

Lagos Island I 
A total of 6 candidates registered with the Independent National Electoral Commission to contest in the election. APC candidate Enitan Badru won the election, defeating PDP Violet Olaitan Williams and 4 other party candidates. Badru received 81.48% of the votes, while Williams received 17.41%.

Lagos Island II 
A total of 4 candidates registered with the Independent National Electoral Commission to contest in the election. APC candidate Moshood Kayode Akiolu won the election, defeating PDP Adamoh-Faniyan Olagbenga and 2 other party candidates. Akiolu received 74.53% of the votes, while Olagbenga received 24.93%.

Lagos Mainland 
A total of 9 candidates registered with the Independent National Electoral Commission to contest in the election. APC candidate Jimoh Abdul won the election, defeating PDP Tajudeen Jaiyeola Agoro and 7 other party candidates. Abdul received 56.06% of the votes, while Agoro received 42.76%.

Mushin I 
A total of 9 candidates registered with the Independent National Electoral Commission to contest in the election. APC candidate Adeyemi Taoveeq Alli won the election, defeating Accord Taoreed Akinsanya and 7 other party candidates. Alli received 58.00% of the votes, while Akinsanya received 27.58%.

Mushin II 
A total of 16 candidates registered with the Independent National Electoral Commission to contest in the election. APC candidate Bolaji Ayinla won the election, defeating PDP Jude Obiekwe and 14 other party candidates. Ayinla received 47.41% of the votes, while Obiekwe received 26.02%.

Ojo 
The election for Ojo federal constituency was declared inconclusive due to collation of results allegedly being interrupted by accusation and counter-accusation by  agents of the political parties. On the 10th of March 2019, INEC declared PDP's Tajudeen Obasa, winner of the election. A supplementary election was held at polling units in Okokomaiko, Ijanikin, Ilogbo and Ojo with Obasa polling 148 additional votes to defeat his closest rival, Durosinmi, who polled 259 votes. Obasa had earlier scored a total votes of 28,691 while APC candidate, Yinka Durosinmi scored 25,545 votes before the election was declared as inconclusive.

Oshodi/Isolo I 
A total of 14 candidates registered with the Independent National Electoral Commission to contest in the election. APC candidate Bashiru Dawodu won the election, defeating PDP Mutiu Shadimu

and 12 other party candidates. Dawodu received 57.66% of the votes, while Shadimu received 40.66%.

Oshodi/Isolo II 
A total of 11 candidates registered with the Independent National Electoral Commission to contest in the election. APC candidate Ganiyu Johnson won the election, defeating PDP Emmanuel Nnodim and 9 other party candidates. Johnson received 54.07% of the votes, while Nnodim received 42.32%.

Somolu 
A total of 10 candidates registered with the Independent National Electoral Commission to contest in the election. APC candidate Ademorin Kuye won the election, defeating PDP Oluwaseyi Olowu and 8 other party candidates. Kuye received 52.66% of the votes, while Olowu received 46.21%.

Surulere I 
A total of 10 candidates registered with the Independent National Electoral Commission to contest in the election. APC candidate Femi Gbajabiamila won the election, defeating PDP Mike Adewara and 8 other party candidates. Gbajabiamila received 63.49% of the votes, while Adewara received 35.12%.

Surulere II 
A total of 9 candidates registered with the Independent National Electoral Commission to contest in the election. PDP candidate Olatunji Shoyinka won the election, defeating APC Lanre Okunlola and 7 other party candidates. Shoyinka received 49.83% of the votes, while Okunlola received 44.74%.

References 

Lagos State House of Representatives elections
House of Representatives
Lagos